The 6th Central American and Caribbean Junior Championships was a junior athletics competition held between the Central American and Caribbean nations, held in San Juan, Puerto Rico, on 21–24 June 1984.

Medal summary
Medal winners are published by category: Junior A, Male, Junior A, Female, and Junior B. 
Complete results can be found on the World Junior Athletics History website.

Male Junior A (under 20)

Female Junior A (under 20)

Male Junior B (under 17)

Female Junior B (under 17)

Medal table (unofficial)

Participation (unofficial)

The Cayman Islands, Saint Kitts and Nevis, Suriname, and the US Virgin Islands competed for the first time at the championships. Detailed result lists can be found on the World Junior Athletics History website.  An unofficial count yields a new record number of about 355 athletes (186 junior (under-20) and 169 youth (under-17)) from about 19 countries, again a new record number of participating nations:

 (5)
 (44)
 (16)
 (7)
 (1)
 (5)
 (6)
 (17)
 (20)
 (4)
 México (59)
 (8)
 Panamá (9)
 (101)
 (3)
 (3)
 (8)
 (19)
 (20)

References

External links
Official CACAC Website
World Junior Athletics History

Central American and Caribbean Junior Championships in Athletics
1984 in Puerto Rican sports
Central American and Caribbean Junior Championships
International athletics competitions hosted by Puerto Rico
Athl
Athl
1984 in youth sport